The City of Ranson (formerly Corporation of Ranson) is a city in Jefferson County, West Virginia, United States. The population was 5433 at the 2020 census. Although the Census Bureau listed it as a town in 2000, it is classified (along with all other municipalities with populations between two and ten thousand) as a city by state law.

History 
The Charles Town Mining, Manufacturing, and Improvement Company played an instrumental role in creating this new town. In 1890, the company bought 850 acres (3.4 km2) adjoining the western and northern corporate limits of Charles Town, and commissioned D.G. Howell, a civil engineer and architect, to lay out the town. The largest tract of land purchased was from the Ranson family. Ranson, in Jefferson County, West Virginia, was officially incorporated in 1910, when residents, by a vote of 67–2, decided to form their own town. It was named in honor of Dr. James Ranson, a dentist and farmer living in the area.

The early growth and development of Ranson reflects the late 19th century boom of the Shenandoah Valley and surrounding areas associated with the rise of the railroads, mining, and manufacturing. Early photographs of Ranson show the offices of the Charles Town Mining, Manufacturing & Improvement Company, and the Hotel Powhatan, along with a few residential structures nearby. The community grew north from Lancaster Circle. Some of the companies that located in Ranson early on included the Hotel Powhatan, the Goetz Saddlery, the Shenandoah Brass and Iron Works, the Elemer E. Beachley Saw and Planing Mill, the John Farrin Boiler and Machine Shop, and the Vulcan Road Machine Company.

One of the most significant structures to be constructed in Ranson was Hotel Powhatan. The building was designed by "Baldwin and Pennington, Architects", and was built by local contractor Julius C. Holmes for $46,500. The hotel opened in October, 1891, but in 1900, it had become the Powhatan College for Young Women. In 1913, the college closed, and in 1915 it was re-opened by the Episcopal Diocese, under the direction of Maria Pendleton Duval, as St. Hilda's Hall for Girls, a Christian school. In 1921, a dormitory was added on property across the street from the original building. This new structure was known as Peterkin Hall, and currently houses the offices of Amerigas. In 1931, with the stock market crash, the school closed, and was converted into apartments. The original hotel structure burned to the ground on December 11, 1937.

In 1936, the town of Ranson purchased the former Charles Town Mining, Manufacturing & Improvement Company office building from Mr. Getzendauner for $3,000 for the purposes of establishing a town hall. In 2003, the City began a multi-year renovation of the entire building, bringing it into the 21st century. By 1941, Ranson's population was 1,171. Ranson continued to grow and by 1950, the population increased to 1,436. By 1970, the population had increased to 2,189. In 2000, Ranson had a population of 2,951. By 2010, the population was at 4,440, an increase of over 50% in just 10 years. In the 2000s, the City Council saw a need to grow its tax and employment base after the unfortunate closings of AB&C Corporation, Dixie Narco, and Badger Powhatan, and took advantage of the commercial development opportunities along the 4-lane stretch of State Route 9 north of Ranson. Thus, the Council annexed several thousand acres, which now host commercial, residential, and agricultural properties.

Today, as Ranson celebrates its centennial, the City is transitioning from a small industrial town, which boomed in the late 19th century, to a community that blends major corporations with quiet residential neighborhoods and a developing commercial district. Many of the homes date from the turn of the century and reflect styles of that era. Most are unassuming, vernacular, frame or brick, single family, two-story dwellings or one-story cottages. Newer one-story homes, townhouses, and apartment complexes have been built on vacant lots throughout Ranson, with most new development being on the western and northern boundaries along the 4-lane U.S. Route 9.

As in the beginning, Ranson continues to host and welcome business and industry to the community. With the construction and opening of the new $425,000 Charles Town General Hospital on October 3, 1948, at the original location of the Hotel Powhatan on 3rd Avenue, Ranson began to develop a medical community, with many doctors opening offices in and around the hospital. On April 22, 1975, Jefferson Memorial Hospital (now Jefferson Medical Center) opened at its current facility on Preston Street and 4th Avenue, at a cost of $4.5 million. The current facility continues to serve the residents of Jefferson County. Just outside the limits of Ranson, but extremely important to the community's economy, is Hollywood Casino at Charles Town Races. This facility provides employment to over 1200 individuals, and generates millions of dollars of taxes to Jefferson County and its municipalities for capital improvements. Thanks, in part, to these proceeds, which began flowing in 2004, the City has been able to purchase police cars and equipment, complete the Mildred Street streetscape project in 2007, which added sidewalks, curb, gutter and benches, renovate and construct parks, and renovate City Hall.

In 2004, the Potomac Marketplace and the surrounding residential subdivisions of Lakeland Place and Shenandoah Springs broke ground and opened. The Marketplace, when completely built, is intended to be a  commercial development, and currently includes national retailers and restaurants such as Home Depot, Kohl's Department Store, Weis Market, McDonald's, Chick-Fil-A, and Petco, to name a few.

Ranson is governed by a mayor, recorder, and five-member city council, who each serve four-year staggered terms. The city employs a city manager who is appointed by council to serve as the administrative head of government. The city is a fully functioning government, with the Ranson Police Department providing 24-hour-per-day, 7-day-per-week protection to the city's citizens. City Hall is staffed with a Planning and Zoning department, Public Works department, Finance department, and Legal department to carry out the functions of government and provide services to the residents of the city. Two volunteer fire departments, Independent Fire Company and Citizens Fire Company, serve the city and provide it with fire protection. Additionally, the city has its own municipal court system.

Transportation

The main highway serving Ranson is West Virginia Route 9. This highway, which is an expressway through Ranson, runs in a general southeast to northwest alignment, connecting Ranson and neighboring Charles Town to Leesburg and Martinsburg. WV 9 also connects to U.S. Route 340 and Interstate 81. The other highway serving Ranson is West Virginia Route 115, which follows WV 9's old alignment from before its newer expressway was constructed.

Geography
Ranson is located at  (39.298578, -77.861169).

Demographics

2020 census

Note: the US Census treats Hispanic/Latino as an ethnic category. This table excludes Latinos from the racial categories and assigns them to a separate category. Hispanics/Latinos can be of any race.

2010 census
As of the census of 2010, there were 4,440 people, 1,699 households, and 1,150 families living in the corporation. The racial makeup of the corporation was 74.3% White, 14.1% African American, 0.2% Native American, 1.4% Asian, 0.1% Pacific Islander, 5.7% from other races, and 4.2% from two or more races. Hispanic or Latino of any race were 12.1% of the population.

There were 1,699 households, of which 38.6% had children under the age of 18 living with them, 42.9% were married couples living together, 18.4% had a female householder with no husband present, 6.4% had a male householder with no wife present, and 32.3% were non-families. 24.7% of all households were made up of individuals, and 7.2% had someone living alone who was 65 years of age or older. The average household size was 2.61 and the average family size was 3.08.

The median age in the corporation was 33 years. 26.6% of residents were under the age of 18; 8.9% were between the ages of 18 and 24; 32% were from 25 to 44; 23.3% were from 45 to 64; and 9.2% were 65 years of age or older. The gender makeup of the corporation was 48.5% male and 51.5% female.

2000 census
As of the census of 2000, there were 2,951 people, 1,208 households, and 782 families living in the town. The racial makeup of the town was 81.80% White, 14.61% African American, 0.14% Native American, 0.37% Asian, 0.03% Pacific Islander, 1.12% from other races, and 1.93% from two or more races. Hispanic or Latino of any race were 3.15% of the population.

There were 1,208 households, out of which 32.4% had children under the age of 18 living with them, 40.0% were married couples living together, 19.3% had a female householder with no husband present, and 35.2% were non-families. 26.5% of all households were made up of individuals, and 8.7% had someone living alone who was 65 years of age or older. The average household size was 2.44 and the average family size was 2.93.

In the town the population was spread out, with 26.1% under the age of 18, 10.4% from 18 to 24, 31.0% from 25 to 44, 21.7% from 45 to 64, and 10.8% who were 65 years of age or older. The median age was 34 years. For every 100 females, there were 89.5 males. For every 100 females age 18 and over, there were 85.8 males.

The median income for a household in the town was $24,485, and the median income for a family was $30,676. Males had a median income of $26,719 versus $19,559 for females. The per capita income for the town was $12,804. About 20.9% of families and 25.2% of the population were below the poverty line, including 34.4% of those under age 18 and 14.5% of those age 65 or over.

References

Cities in Jefferson County, West Virginia
Cities in West Virginia
Populated places established in 1890
Washington metropolitan area
1890 establishments in West Virginia